The episodes of Samurai Harem: Asu no Yoichi anime are based on the manga of the same name written by Yū Minamoto. The episodes were directed by Rion Kujo and produced by Anime International Company. The general animation director was Ishii Yumiko and Morishima Noriko was the character designer. The screenplay was written by Hideyuki Kurata. Composed by Kikuya Tomoki, the music was produced by Lantis with Jin Aketagawa as the sound director. The plot follows the adventures of a teenage samurai named Yoichi Karasuma as he lives in with the Ikaruga family, after being ordered by his father, to live with them in order to learn more martial arts. As Yoichi struggles to live in the city and starts going to school, he meets students of the Saginomiya clan, martial art rivals to the Ikaruga family and their Ukiha Divine Wind Style Swordplay school of martial arts.

The anime's twelve episodes were broadcast on Tokyo Broadcasting System between January 8, 2009 and March 26, 2009. The anime was broadcast on Sun Television from January 25, 2009 to March 2009. Chubu-Nippon Broadcasting and BS-i both aired the first episode on January 29, 2009. The series used two pieces of theme music. Geneon Entertainment released the twelve Asu no Yoichi! episodes in six Region 2 DVD compilations from March 25, 2009 to August 21, 2009.



Episode list

Volume DVDs
Geneon Entertainment released six Region 2 DVD compilations, each containing two episodes, between March 25, 2009 and August 21, 2009. Limited editions of all six compilations, each of which contains a bonus CD, were also released.

References

External links
 Official TBS Asu no Yoichi! website 

Samurai Harem Asu no Yoichi